The Ireland national rugby union team toured Japan in summer 1985, playing five matches, including two against the Japan national team. The IRFU did not award caps for these internationals. The Ciaran Fitzgerald-led side earned a 48–13 victory in the first clash in Osaka, with winger Trevor Ringland scoring three tries. In the second tie at Tokyo's Chichibu ground, Michael Kiernan scored two tries as the Irish came from being level-pegging at 12–12 at half-time, to leading 33–15 with a second half spurt by the final whistle
.

Matches
Scores and results list Ireland's points tally first.

Touring party
Source:

Manager: Des McKibbin
Assistant Manager: Mick Doyle
Medical Officer: J. Gallagher
Captain: Ciaran Fitzgerald (St Mary's College)

Backs
P. Rainey (Ballymena)
 H. MacNeill (Oxford U, London Irish)
 T. Ringland (Ballymena)
 K. Crossan (Instonians)
 M. Kiernan (Lansdowne, Dolphin)
 B. Mullin (Dublin U)
 M. Finn (Cork Con)
 T. McMaster (Bangor)
 J. Hewitt (NIFC) joined tour as replacement
 P. Dean (St Mary’s Coll)
 R. Keyes (Cork Con)
 M. Bradley (Cork Con)
 R. Brady (Ballymena) 

Forwards
 P. Kennedy (London Irish)
 M. Fitzpatrick (Wanderers)
 J. McCoy (Dungannon)
 P. Orr (Old Wesley)
 C. Fitzgerald (St Mary’s Coll)
 Capt. H. Harbison (Bective Rangers)
 B. McCall (London Irish)
 W. Anderson (Dungannon)
 D. Lenihan (Cork Con)
 N. Carr (Ards)
 P. Matthews (Ards)
 B. Spillane (Bohemians)
 P. Kenny (Wanderers)
 P. Collins (Highfield)

See also

References

Ireland national rugby union team tours
Rugby union tours of Japan
Ireland tour
Japan
Ireland–Japan relations